North Valley is a census-designated place (CDP) in Bernalillo County, New Mexico, United States. As of the 2010 Census, the CDP population was 11,333. It is part of the Albuquerque Metropolitan Statistical Area.

Geography

Climate
North Valley has an arid climate (BSk, depending on the particular scheme of the Köppen climate classification system one uses), With daytime temperature averaging about five degrees warmer than the Albuquerque International Sunport and overnight lows averaging slightly cooler. North Valley has a more of a desert feel especially in the summer months when temperatures often reach +.

Winters are mild with cold nights and warm days.

Spring can be windy at times with blowing dust but pleasant for the most part.

Summer brings hot conditions with low humidity typical of the desert southwest. Monsoon season usually start in late June to early July and may last until mid to late September, depending on the annual intensity of the moist air from the Gulf of California.

Fall brings cooler temperatures and drier conditions. Nights can get chilly at times but are pleasant at others. One can watch the Albuquerque International Balloon Fiesta from their yards from anywhere in the North Valley.

Demographics

As of the census of 2000, there were 11,923 people, 4,467 households, and 3,095 families residing in the CDP. The population density was 1,645.3 people per square mile (635.0/km2). There were 4,772 housing units at an average density of 658.5 per square mile (254.1/km2). The racial makeup of the CDP was 73.62% White, 1.04% African American, 2.91% Native American, 0.41% Asian, 0.06% Pacific Islander, 18.19% from other races, and 3.77% from two or more races. Hispanic or Latino of any race were 56.81% of the population.

There were 4,467 households, out of which 30.0% had children under the age of 18 living with them, 50.1% were married couples living together, 12.8% had a female householder with no husband present, and 30.7% were non-families. 24.7% of all households were made up of individuals, and 8.8% had someone living alone who was 65 years of age or older. The average household size was 2.59 and the average family size was 3.08.

In the CDP, the population was spread out, with 25.6% under the age of 18, 8.3% from 18 to 24, 26.2% from 25 to 44, 25.8% from 45 to 64, and 14.1% who were 65 years of age or older. The median age was 39 years. For every 100 females, there were 99.4 males. For every 100 females age 18 and over, there were 96.7 males.

The median income for a household in the CDP was $39,888, and the median income for a family was $45,129. Males had a median income of $31,948 versus $26,433 for females. The per capita income for the CDP was $19,398. About 8.5% of families and 10.7% of the population were below the poverty line, including 13.5% of those under age 18 and 10.1% of those age 65 or over.

Education
It is zoned to Albuquerque Public Schools.

References

Census-designated places in Bernalillo County, New Mexico
Census-designated places in New Mexico
Albuquerque metropolitan area